Tyrone Hall (born January 17, 1989) is an American soccer player who plays for the Harrisburg Heat in the Major Arena Soccer League. He has also played abroad in South America and Finland, and has spent time playing both professional indoor and outdoor soccer in the United States.

Career

Professional career
Hall signed with USL Pro club Charlotte Eagles on April 1, 2014. Prior to this, Hall had played with MISL club Pennsylvania Roar in 2013.

Hall rejoined the Harrisburg Heat on February 2, 2022.

References

1989 births
Living people
American soccer players
Charlotte Eagles players
Association football midfielders
Soccer players from Baltimore
USL Championship players
Florida Tropics SC players
Harrisburg Heat (MASL) players
Major Arena Soccer League players
Tacoma Stars (2003–) players
Radford Highlanders men's soccer players
Ontario Fury players
American expatriate soccer players
American expatriate sportspeople in Brazil
American expatriate sportspeople in Finland
Expatriate footballers in Brazil
Expatriate footballers in Finland